Sohna Elevated Corridor  or Sohna–Gurgaon road is a  long, access controlled, six-lane wide elevated corridor in Gurgaon district of Haryana, India. The project has been completed by the National Highways Authority of India (NHAI) at an estimated cost of ₹1,466 crore. It was fully opened for public on 11 July 2022.

Construction
The NHAI has divided the construction work of this project into two packages.

2020 Accident
A major mishap during project execution happened on 22 August 2020, when a section of the under-construction flyover came crashing down. The cause of this collapse was attributed to the caving in of three recently installed girders between two pillars. The accident spot is close to the Vipul Greens residential apartment complex on Sohna Road and is located in a high-traffic zone. However, owing to partial lock-down measures enforced by the Government of Haryana, many businesses and leisure outlets were closed at that time. This helped in avoiding fatalities and in keeping the casualty figure low. According to Gurgaon Police, two labourers suffered minor injuries and there were no injuries among pedestrians or people in passing vehicles.

Status updates
 Jan 2021: Construction work of Package 1 is 32% complete and Package 2 is 70% complete.
Sep 2021: The corridor is around 60% completed, and is expected to be fully completed and become operational by June 2022.
 April 2022: 12.7 km long Badshahpur to Sohna (Package-2) opened for traffic on 1 April by NHAI. Rajiv Chowk in Gurgaon to Badshahpur (Package-1) will be completed by June 2022.
 July 2022: Package-1 (Gurgaon to Badshahpur) opened to public by the NHAI on 11 July 2022. This markes the completion of the entire project. It was inaugurated by Road transport and Highways Minister Shri Nitin Gadkari.

See also
 Delhi-Mumbai Expressway
 Delhi-Jaipur Expressway
 Delhi-Gurgaon Expressway
 Western Peripheral Expressway (KMP)
Dwarka Expressway

References

Expressways in Delhi
Expressways in Haryana
Transport in Gurgaon